Isabel Constance Clarke (1869 – 13 April 1951) was a British Catholic novelist and biographer. author of over fifty books. She considered the novel to be a "definite apostolate" for its ability to bring the Catholic faith to those who are ignorant of it. Popular Catholic children's author Francis J. Finn called her the "greatest living Catholic novelist."

Bibliography
 The Castle of San Salvo
 Selma
 It Happened in Rome
 Strangers of Rome
 The Villab by the Sea
 Children of the Shadow
 Anna Nugent
 Viola Hudson
 The Light on the Lagoon
 The Lamp of Destiny
 A Case of Conscience
 Ursula Finch
 The Elstones
 Eunice
 Children of Eve
 The Deep Heart
 Fine Clay
 The Rest House
 Only Anne
 Average Cabins
 Carina
 The Potter's House
 Tressider's Sister
 Lady Trent's Daughter
 Whose Name is Legion
 Prisoner's Years
 The Secret Citadel
 By the Blue River

References 

1869 births
1951 deaths
20th-century British novelists
20th-century biographers
20th-century British women writers
British religious writers
British children's writers
British Roman Catholics
British biographers
20th-century British non-fiction writers
British women children's writers
British women novelists
Roman Catholic writers
Women biographers
Women religious writers